is a Japanese actor, known primary for his roles in Japanese television dramas. His roles are often positions of authority, such as managers, principals, or police officers, but many of these characters also share a certain kookiness and incompetence. Several of these characters wear wigs for comic effect.

Filmography

Films
1999 - Gamera 3: Iris Kakusei (1999)
2000 - Keizoku: The Movie ~Beautiful Dreamer~
2002 - TRICK: the Movie - Detective Kenzō Yabe
2003 - Sharasojyu
2004 - 
2004 - Kamikaze Girls - Pachinko parlor manager
2005 - Samurai Commando Mission 1549
2005 - Yaji and Kita: The Midnight Pilgrims
2006 - The Uchōten Hotel
2006 - TRICK: the Movie 2 - Detective Kenzō Yabe
2009 - Saidoweizu  (サイドウェイズ) - Daisuke Uehara
2009 - Yatterman - Boyacky
2010 - The Lone Scalpel 
2013 - I'll Give It My All... Tomorrow - Miyata
2015 - April Fools
2016 - Shippu Rondo
2017 - Mixed Doubles
2018 - Inuyashiki
2019 - Masquerade Hotel
2019 - The Confidence Man JP: The Movie
2019 - Ninkyō Gakuen
2020 - Kaiji: Final Game - Kōtarō Sakazaki
2020 - The Confidence Man JP: Episode of the Princess
2020 - Godai - The Wunderkind
2021 - Your Turn to Kill: The Movie
2022 - The Confidence Man JP: Episode of the Hero
2023 - The Water Flows to the Sea - Naruse

Television dramas
1988-1989

1990

1994
Hana no ran

1996

1997

 -  Inoue Harutada (Taiga drama)
1998

1999
 - Okado Shigetomo (Taiga drama)
Amai Seikatsu

Keizoku
2000
TRICK - Detective Kenzō Yabe
Quiz
2001

2002

TRICK 2 - Detective Kenzō Yabe
Gokusen - Vice Principal Gorō Sawatari
HR

2003
Saturday Night at the Mysteries - Aibō 2 Season 2
TRICK 3 - Detective Kenzō Yabe

2004
Shinsengumi! - Tonouchi Yoshio
2005
Gokusen 2 -  Vice Principal Gorō Sawatari
 - Shunsuke Kikuchi
Brother Beat - Hideki Noguchi
Grave of the Fireflies

2006

14-year-old Mother - Tadahiko Ichinose
2007

2008
Gokusen 3 - Vice Principal Gorō Sawatari
 - Hideki Jonouchi
2010
Ryōmaden - Yoshida Shōin
2012
 - Choichiro Miki
2013
Galileo - Eiji Takado
 - Choichiro Miki
2014
Nobunaga Concerto - Imagawa Yoshimoto
2015
Gakkō no Kaidan - Hirao Kintoki
2016
Beppin san
2018
Kamen Rider Zi-O - Junichirō Tokiwa 
2019
Ieyasu, Edo wo Tateru
Your Turn to Kill
2021
Ochoyan - Makoto Nagasawa
Kotaro Lives Alone - Isamu Tamaru

Video games
1992
Fatal Fury 2 - Joe Higashi, Billy Kane, Laurence Blood
1993
Fatal Fury Special - Joe Higashi, Billy Kane, Laurence Blood, Geese Howard
1994
The King of Fighters '94 - Joe Higashi
1995
The King of Fighters '95 - Billy Kane

Dubbing
The Addams Family, Gomez Addams
The Addams Family 2, Gomez Addams

References

External links

Official Cube profile
Katsuhisa Namase at NHK Archives

1960 births
Living people
Japanese male film actors
Japanese male television actors
Japanese male video game actors
Japanese male voice actors
People from Nishinomiya
20th-century Japanese male actors
21st-century Japanese male actors